The Democratic People's Party (DNP) is a populist and social conservative political party in Montenegro.

History
The Democratic People's Party was founded in 2015 from the former Socialist People's Party (SNP) faction led by Milan Knežević and Predrag Bulatović which left the Party and joined the Democratic Front alliance as an independent group, prior the October 2012 parliamentary election. DNP currently has four MPs in the Parliament of Montenegro elected from the list of the Democratic Front alliance on 2016 election.

On 9 May 2019, paty leader Knežević, along with 13 another people found guilty by the Higher Court for the allegedly "plotting to commit terrorist acts and undermine the constitutional order of Montenegro on the day of 2016 parliamentary election." In 2021, the appellate court annulled the first instance verdict on all counts of the indictment.

Ideology
The party views the Serb community, which it represents, as discriminated against. It sees Montenegro as pursuing the concept of a nation-state and the politics of assimilation. Serbs and Montenegrins are viewed of as being one and the same people. It demands that the Serbian language enters the Constitution of Montenegro as the official language. The party is currently the main advocate of Serbian-Montenegrin unionism, together with its coalition partner the New Serb Democracy.

The Democratic People's Party jointly with New Serb Democracy maintains cooperation with Russian far-right Rodina and United Russia parties as well with Serb nationalist Alliance of Independent Social Democrats from Bosnia and Herzegovina, and the party also maintains a very close cooperation with the right-wing populist Serbian Progressive Party regime in Serbia.

Elections

Parliamentary elections

Presidential elections

References

2015 establishments in Montenegro
Conservative parties in Montenegro
Political parties established in 2015
Serb political parties in Montenegro
Eurosceptic parties in Montenegro
Social conservative parties
Social democratic parties in Montenegro
Right-wing parties in Europe